Mullaghboy is a small village and townland (of 251 acres) on Islandmagee in County Antrim, Northern Ireland. It is situated in the civil parish of Islandmagee and the historic barony of Belfast Lower. It is within the Larne Borough Council area. It had a population of 364 people (148 households) in the 2011 Census. (2001 Census: 294 people).

References 

Villages in County Antrim
Townlands of County Antrim
Civil parish of Island Magee